Krypts is a Finnish death metal band from Helsinki, Uusimaa. Their first studio album, Unending Degradation, was released through Dark Descent Records on 19 February 2013.

Band members
Current
 Otso Ukkonen - drums, guitars (2008–present)
 Ville Snicker - guitars (2008–present)
 Antti Kotiranta - vocals, bass (2008–present)
 Jukka Aho - guitars (2015–present)

Former
 Topi Siirtola - guitars (2009-2012)

Live musicians
 Rami Simelius - lead guitars (2013–2015)

Discography

Studio albums
Unending Degradation (2013)
Remnants of Expansion (2016)
Cadaver Circulation (2019)

EPs
Krypts (2011)

Demos
 Open the Crypt (2009)

References

Finnish death metal musical groups